Plateau pressure (PPLAT) is the pressure applied to small airways and alveoli during positive-pressure mechanical ventilation.  It is measured during an inspiratory pause on the mechanical ventilator.
In ARDS maintain plateau pressure <30cm of water measured on ventilator.

References

Mechanical ventilation